Donna Sue "Susie" Morgan, known professionally as Susie Morgan, formerly known as Donna Sue Beach & Donna Sue Leteff, (born April 22, 1953) is a United States district judge of the United States District Court for the Eastern District of Louisiana.

Early life and education
Born in Winnsboro, Louisiana, Morgan earned a Bachelor of Arts in 1974 from Northeast Louisiana University in Monroe, Louisiana, and her Master of Arts in 1976. She obtained a Juris Doctor; Order of the Coif in 1980 from the Louisiana State University Paul M. Hebert Law Center.

Professional career
Morgan first worked from 1980 to 1981 as a law clerk to Judge Henry Anthony Politz of the United States Court of Appeals for the Fifth Circuit. Morgan joined the Shreveport firm of Wiener, Weiss and Madison in 1981, where she started as an associate and became a partner in 1985. She worked with them for more than 24 years.

She most recently practiced in the New Orleans office of the Phelps Dunbar law firm since 2005, where she became a partner in 2009.

Federal judicial service
On June 7, 2011, President Barack Obama nominated Morgan to a seat on the United States District Court for the Eastern District of Louisiana that had been vacated by Judge Thomas Porteous' impeachment. On November 10, 2011, the Senate Judiciary Committee reported her nomination to the floor of the Senate by a voice vote. On March 28, 2012, her nomination was confirmed by a 96–1 vote. She received her commission on March 30, 2012. Morgan has overseen the New Orleans Police Department Consent Decree since its entry in January 2013. On January 31, 2019, Morgan ruled against New Orleans Saints ticket holders seeking to compel the NFL and the NFL Commissioner to enforce a rule that would alter the result of or force a replay of the 2018-2019 NFC Championship game.

References

External links

1953 births
Living people
American women lawyers
Judges of the United States District Court for the Eastern District of Louisiana
Louisiana State University Law Center alumni
People from Winnsboro, Louisiana
United States district court judges appointed by Barack Obama
21st-century American judges
University of Louisiana at Monroe alumni
21st-century American women judges